Zola Levitt (December 3, 1938 – April 19, 2006) was a Jewish believer in Christianity who founded Zola Levitt Ministries, in Dallas, Texas, in 1979.

Ministry and religious works
Known for his relatability, charisma and visits to evangelical churches dressed as a Levite, Levitt grew his organization's outreach to a national scale. Levitt authored books and wrote, produced, and directed Judeo-Christian music and musicals. Furthermore, he created a popular free print publication, The Levitt Letter, which covered global news with a Messianic focus. He also produced and starred in his own television and radio programs, concluding each episode with his signature phrase “Pray for the Peace of Jerusalem.” Because Levitt sought to share the New Testament with Jews through the use of Old Testament Scripture, he drew "protest from the factions of the Jewish community, which objected to what they felt was a distortion of Jewish teachings." Levitt sponsored a grove in Israel to which his followers could donate trees with the purpose of making the country green in preparation for Christ's return.

Theological beliefs 

Levitt was a classical dispensationalist, believing that the nation of Israel is playing a crucial role in signalling the beginning of the end times.  Levitt disagreed with progressive dispensationalism, which supposes that aspects of the Millennial Kingdom are present in the modern world.  Levitt opposed such a stance because he believed it minimized the role of Israel in God's plan for the future.

References

External links
Zola Levitt Ministries official website

1938 births
2006 deaths
American evangelicals
People from Pittsburgh
People from Dallas
Duquesne University alumni
Indiana University alumni